Alba Salix, Royal Physician is a comedy fantasy podcast.

Background 
The show has had difficulty generating funds. The show focuses on magical ailments that Alba Salix diagnoses and cures. The show is set in the fantastical world of Farloria. The show is similar to a sitcom.

Cast and characters 
Barbara Clifford as Alba Salix
Julian Sark as Magnus of Hezelford
Olivia Jon as Holly
George Bertwell as King Gunther
Marisa King as Queen Parabel
Carter Siddall as Helbard Krankel

Reception 
The show was nominated for four awards at the 2015 Audio Verse Awards. The show won a Gold in "The Ogle Award for Fantasy" at the 2015 Mark Time Awards. The show was a 2020 Nominee for the T.O. Webfest.

See also 

 List of fantasy podcasts

References

External links 

Fantasy podcasts

2014 podcast debuts
Audio podcasts
Canadian podcasts
Scripted podcasts